Jagatpur is a village and market center in Kanchan Roop Municipality in Saptari District in the Sagarmatha Zone of south-eastern Nepal. It was merged in the municipality along with other 8 Villages since 18 May 2013. At the time of the 1991 Nepal census it had a population of 3699 people residing in 662 individual households.

References

Populated places in Saptari District